Sarangani is a Manobo language of the Davao Region of Mindanao in the Philippines.

Distribution
Sarangani Manobo is spoken in the Davao Region of southern Mindanao, Philippines. Specifically, it is spoken in Jose Abad Santos, Davao Occidental; Governor Generoso, Davao Oriental; and Glan, Sarangani.

References

Further reading

 
 

Manobo languages
Languages of Davao Occidental